This is a list of National Rail stations in the ceremonial county of Northumberland, England, with estimated usage figures gathered from data collected by the Office of Rail and Road (ORR). As of February 2023, there are 17 stations located along two lines in Northumberland, from which around 2.08 million passenger journeys were made from April 2021–March 2022. Both lines (the north–south East Coast Main Line and the east–west Tyne Valley Line) run perpendicular to each other and meet at Newcastle, with some services going from one line to the other.

Within the historic county of Northumberland are two additional stations not within the ceremonial county: Newcastle and Manors, both in Newcastle upon Tyne in Tyne and Wear. Newcastle had 7,040,072 journeys for '21–'22 whilst Manors had 14,420. The Tyne and Wear Metro also serves the historic county, having 19 stations within Newcastle and another 17 in North Tyneside.

Another five railway stations are under construction to be opened in December 2023 with the Northumberland Line: Ashington, Bedlington, Blyth Bebside, Newsham, and Seaton Delaval. As well, in the historic county, the Northumberland Park Metro station in North Tyneside will be converted into a railway interchange. Northern Trains will manage all of the new stations and be their exclusive operator.

There are also a number of heritage railway stations across the county, whose main purpose is tourism rather than transport. These are on the Aln Valley Railway, the Heatherslaw Light Railway, the South Tynedale Railway, and the Woodhorn Narrow Gauge Railway, as well as the North Tyneside Steam Railway in North Tyneside.

References

See also
 List of busiest railway stations in Great Britain
 Station usage in Tyne and Wear

 
Busiest railway stations in Northumberland